Felicitas Woll (born 20 January 1980) is a German actress. She is perhaps best known for her roles in the television series Berlin, Berlin (2002–2005) and the television film Dresden (2006).

Career and personal life
Felicitas Woll grew up in Harbshausen (Hesse). She took an apprenticeship as a nurse, but became an actress after she met the theatrical agent Frank Oliver Schulz. After a casting session she was cast and appeared in the TV-Series Die Camper, subsequently remaining with the show for three years. In 1998 she began taking acting lessons at the Düsseldorfer Tanzhaus (Düsseldorf Dance House) under Wladimir Matuchin. She plays piano, guitar and keyboards and gained theatrical experience as a singer.

After her role as 'Tanja Ewermann' in Die Camper, she appeared in Für alle Fälle Stefanie and Hamann-Spezial. At the end of 1999 she appeared in the starring role in the German-Chinese Co-Production True Love Is Invisible (a TV series) and in a family series for Germany's second public service TV channel, ZDF (Nesthocker – Familie zu verschenken). Success continued in 2001 with Mädchen, Mädchen by Dennis Gansel, her breakthrough.

Her largest previous success had been as 'Lolle', acting with Jan Sosniok (Sven Ehlers), his best friend Hart (Matthias Klimsa) and Lolles best friend Sarah (Rhea Harder) together, in the ARD evening series Berlin, Berlin, which won the 2002 Deutschen Fernsehpreis, 2003 the Adolf-Grimme-Preis and in 2004 the Goldene Rose von Lucerne for the best female actress in a sitcom. For Berlin, Berlin she received an Emmy in 2004.

2005 was a turning point for the ZDF co-production Dresden (original title The Fire). In the film, a young German nurse (Woll), falls in love with a wounded English bomber pilot (played by John Light) on the eve of the destruction of the city by allied bombers in February 1945. The movie was filmed in Dresden's rebuilt city centre as well as at the railway station (also rebuilt) and in other parts of Dresden. Other scenes such as the theatre place and at the prince course, was continued in Chemnitz and at an industrial estate in Cologne, in order to use remote studios to film the larger fire scenes, such as the firestorm. The film, in which Heiner Lauterbach and Wolfgang Stumph also star, was broadcast in two parts on 5 March and 6 March 2006.

Woll is currently involved in supporting the cause of people with Down syndrome (Trisomie 21) in the poster campaign of the Posterkampagne des DS-Infocenters. On the posters and post cards she is pictured with her younger brother, Tassilo, who was born with Down syndrome. The wording on the posters reads: "A brother with Down's Syndrome is sometimes like hell. Just like every other brother in fact."

On 9 November 2005 Woll announced that she was pregnant and on 14 February 2006 gave birth to a daughter named Taisha Valentina.

In 2008 she portrayed Wörterfee, a new character on the German adaptation of Sesame Street (Sesamstrasse).

In 2011 she played Bertha Benz in the ARD TV-movie .

Filmography
2013 - , ZDF, as 'Pia Kirchhoff'
2011 - , ARD, TV-film, first broadcast 23 May 2011
2009 - 
2006 - Dresden, ZDF, as 'Anna Mauth'
2004 - Eine Krone für Isabell, ZDF, TV-film, first broadcast 1 January 2006
2004 - , BR Deutschland, second big-screen feature film
2001 to 2005 - Berlin, Berlin, TV-cult series, ARD, as 'Lolle'
2002 - Tatort, ARD, long-running TV-series since 1970, guest star
2002 - Dr. Sommerfeld, ARD, TV-series, guest star
2002 - Inshallah - Club der Träume, ZDF, TV-series
2001 - Mädchen, Mädchen, BR Deutschland, first big-screen feature film
2000 - Für alle Fälle Stefanie, SAT 1, TV-series, guest star
1999 to 2000 - Nesthocker – Familie zu verschenken, ZDF, TV-series
1999 - Hamann - special, ZDF, TV-series
1999 to 2000 - True Love Is Invisible, TV-series BR Deutschland/China
1998 to 2000 - Die Camper, RTL, TV-series

Awards 
2002 Deutscher Fernsehpreis (best actress - Series - Berlin Berlin)
2003 Adolf-Grimme-Preis (Main role as 'Lolle' in Berlin Berlin)
2004 Rose d'Or (best actress - Sitcom - Berlin Berlin)
2006 Bayerischer Fernsehpreis for Dresden
 
En el 2014 actuo  en el papel de la periodista Elcke Adler en la serie de la RAI "El giudice meschino"

References

External links
 
 German fan site 
 Further German fan site
 Small German fan site with Community 
 Personal fan site with many pictures and all episodes of berlin berlin(german & english)

1980 births
Living people
People from Homberg (Efze)
German television actresses
21st-century German actresses